Mutiganda wa Nkunda (born 18 October 1989), is a Rwandan filmmaker particularly involved as a screenwriter and producer in many television serials.

Personal life
He was born on 18 October 1989 in Kigali, Rwanda.

Career
In 2013, he completed a bachelor's degree in Agriculture. However he later moved to film journalism and filmmaking due to his passion to cinema. Later in the same year, his first 4 short fiction screenplays were shortlisted in the Global Dialogues Short Story Creating Contest. In 2014, he wrote, produced and directed his maiden short film Rayila. It is a story of a mother who abandons her baby and commit suicide. The film gained critical acclaim and won awards in several local and international film festivals.

Also in 2014, he wrote the popular sitcom Inshuti which aired on TV 10 Rwanda between 2014 and 2015. It is regarded as the first ever TV series to be produced in Rwanda. It was also released on YouTube and received fan following as well. In 2015, Nkunda worked as a producer on a short film Ishaba produced during the filmmaking workshop conducted at inaugural Mashariki African Film Festival (MAAFF). The short was screened at international film festivals and released on DVD by Africalia as part of African Best Short films collection. Later in the year, he attended Maisha Film Lab screenwriting workshop in Kigali, where he worked as a writer on popular comedy series Seburikoko which first aired on Rwanda Television in March 2015. Meanwhile, he worked as a film critic and journalist since 2013 in several local media. He later made an experimental short film, La Femme Nue which was selected for the 3rd edition at the MAAFF.

After leaving his journalism career in 2016, he focused completely on filmmaking. He directed TV series City Maid, which currently airs on Rwanda Television. At the same time, he made the serial Virunga School that airs on Royal TV. Then he wrote, produced, and directed his second short film, Ibanga ry’umunezero, in 2017. Meanwhile, he co-founded the independent film production company IZACU. Under the company, he made his first feature film, Nameless, which he self-funded and later pitched it at Takmil workshop of Carthage Film Festival 2018. At the workshop, the film was bought by the French giant Orange Studio and the film is premiering at 2021 Fribourg Film Festival in Switzerland. It was selected to compete in the main competition at FESPACO 2021 where it won the prize for best scenario. As a producer, he produced A Taste of our Land which won the best first film awards at PanAfrican Film Festival 2020 and AMAAs 2021.

Filmography

References

External links
 

Living people
Rwandan film directors
Rwandan film producers
1989 births